Lake Ambussel is a lake on the Lossogonoi Plateau in Tanzania.  Along with Nyumba ya Mungu Reservoir, Lake Chala and Lake Jipe, it is one of four waterbodies in the Pangani basin.

References

Ambussel